Judge Elliott may refer to:

J. Robert Elliott (1910–2006), judge of the United States District Court for the Middle District of Georgia
James Douglas Elliott (1859–1933), judge of the United States District Court for the District of South Dakota
Samantha D. Elliott (born 1975), judge of the United States District Court for the District of New Hampshire

See also
Justice Elliott (disambiguation)